Anne Greenough  (born August 1954 in Newcastle upon Tyne) is a British neonatologist and is most notable for research into clinical and academic neonatology through work relating to the origins, markers and management of chronic lung disease following preterm birth. Greenough is Professor of Neonatology and Clinical Respiratory Physiology at King's College London.

Honours
Greenough was awarded the James Spence Medal in 2017.

Bibliography
 
 
 

The following are proceedings,

References

Living people
1954 births
Scientists from Newcastle upon Tyne
Fellows of King's College London
British neonatologists
British medical researchers
Women medical researchers